The following are the winners of the 4th annual ENnie Awards, held in 2004:

References

External links
 2004 ENnie Awards

 
ENnies winners